The 2007 World Table Tennis Championships was a table tennis tournament that took place in Zagreb, Croatia from May 21 through to May 27, 2007. China won a clean sweep of all the gold and silver medals.

Medal summary

Medal table

Events

Finals

Men's singles

 Wang Liqin def.  Ma Lin, 4–3: 4–11, 8–11, 11–5, 4–11, 11–9, 11–8, 11–6

Women's singles

 Guo Yue def.  Li Xiaoxia, 4–3: 8–11, 11–7, 4–11, 2–11, 11–5, 11–2, 11–8

Men's doubles

 Chen Qi / Ma Lin def.  Wang Hao / Wang Liqin, 4–2: 6–11, 11–7, 6–11, 11–3, 11–9, 11–9

Women's doubles

 Wang Nan / Zhang Yining def.   Guo Yue / Li Xiaoxia, 4–0: 11–5, 11–6, 13–11, 11–9

Mixed doubles

 Wang Liqin / Guo Yue def.  Ma Lin / Wang Nan, 4–2: 13–11, 11–7, 8–11, 11–9, 9–11, 12–10

External links
International Table Tennis Federation (ITTF) website

 
World Table Tennis Championships
Table
W
Table Tennis
Table tennis competitions in Croatia
Sports competitions in Zagreb
May 2007 sports events in Europe
2000s in Zagreb